is a 1987 Japanese science fiction horror original video directed by Jôji Iida.

External links
 
 

1987 horror films
1980s science fiction horror films
1987 films
Japanese science fiction horror films
1980s Japanese films